The 2017–18 Egyptian Premier League (also known as the Telecom Egypt Premier League for sponsorship reasons) was the 59th season of the Egyptian Premier League, the top Egyptian professional league for association football clubs, since its establishment in 1948. The season started on 8 September 2017 and concluded on 20 May 2018. Fixtures for the 2017–18 season were announced on 30 August 2017.

Al Ahly won and secured their record-extending fortieth Egyptian Premier League title with six games to spare, following Al Masry's 0–0 draw with El Entag El Harby on 12 March 2018. The team broke numerous league records over the course of the season, including: most points (88), most wins (28) and most goals scored (75). Al Ahly were the defending champions and successfully defended it, while Al Assiouty Sport, Al Nasr and El Raja have entered as the promoted teams from the 2016–17 Egyptian Second Division.

Teams

A total of eighteen teams will compete in the league - the top fifteen teams from the previous season, and three teams promoted from the Second Division.

Stadia
''Note: Table lists in alphabetical order.

Personnel and kits

1. On the back of shirt.
2. On the sleeves.

Managerial changes

Notes

Results

League table

Positions by round
The table lists the positions of teams after each week of matches. In order to preserve chronological evolvements, any postponed matches are not included in the round at which they were originally scheduled, but added to the full round they were played immediately afterwards. For example, if a match is scheduled for matchday 13, but then postponed and played between days 16 and 17, it will be added to the standings for day 16.
 

Source: Soccerway

Results table

Season statistics

Top goalscorers

Notes

Hat-tricks

Note
(H) – Home ; (A) – Away

Top assists

Notes

References

 

1
 
2017–18 in Egyptian football
Egypt